Count Edward Aleksander Raczyński (1847–1926) was a Polish nobleman, landowner, patron of the arts, and founder of the Raczyński Art Gallery in Rogalin.

Biography

Raczyński was an adventurer and world traveller. After the death of his father in 1864, at the age of 17 he escaped to Turkey for a few months with a friend, Roger Ziolecki, after his guardians attempted to send him to Wroclaw; he was later badly wounded in the 1867 Battle of Mentana, then in 1869 went to Chile, then back to France in 1870 to take part in a war, and in 1874 settled in Kraków at the residence of his aunt countess Katarzyna Potocka.

He became a star of the local society, and was featured in Jan Matejko's Battle of Grunwald (painting) in the lower right-hand section, as the young bearded man with the white bandage on his head wound.

References

1847 births
1926 deaths
Nobility from Dresden
Counts of Poland
Polish art collectors
Edward